Tadashi Murakami   is a Japanese mixed martial artist.

Mixed martial arts record

|-
| Loss
| align=center| 2-2-1
| Mamoru Okochi
| Decision (unanimous)
| Shooto - Shooto
| 
| align=center| 5
| align=center| 3:00
| Tokyo, Japan
| 
|-
| Draw
| align=center| 2-1-1
| Kenji Ogusu
| Draw
| Shooto - Shooto
| 
| align=center| 3
| align=center| 3:00
| Tokyo, Japan
| 
|-
| Loss
| align=center| 2-1
| Mamoru Okochi
| Decision (unanimous)
| Shooto - Shooto
| 
| align=center| 3
| align=center| 3:00
| Tokyo, Japan
| 
|-
| Win
| align=center| 2-0
| Tadeshi Kaneko
| Decision (unanimous)
| Shooto - Shooto
| 
| align=center| 3
| align=center| 3:00
| Tokyo, Japan
| 
|-
| Win
| align=center| 1-0
| Takashi Nishizawa
| Submission (achilles lock)
| Shooto - Shooto
| 
| align=center| 1
| align=center| 1:12
| Tokyo, Japan
|

See also
List of male mixed martial artists

References

External links
 
 Tadashi Murakami at mixedmartialarts.com

Japanese male mixed martial artists
Living people
Year of birth missing (living people)